Upadeśa (Sanskrit: उपदेश), "teaching," "instruction", is the spiritual guidance provided by a guru or spiritual teacher.

Etymology
The term upadeśa has various, related meanings:
 "information," "clarification," "specification"
 "preaching," "prescription"
 "instruction," "guidance," "pointing out to"
 "initiation," "communication of the initiatory mantra or formula"

Spiritual guidance
In Indian religions, both Hinduism and Buddhism, upadeśa is the spiritual instruction and example provided by the guru:

The term can also be used for the Buddhist Abhidhamma and other religious commentaries.

See also
 Upadesasahasri - A thousand teachings, a text by Adi Shankara
 Ramana Maharshi

References

Hindu education
Buddhist education